Noppanon Kachaplayuk (born 2 August 1991) is a Thai professional footballer who plays as a right back for Thai League 1 club Chonburi.

Honours

International
Thailand U-19
 AFF U-19 Youth Championship: 2009

References

External links
 

1991 births
Living people
Noppanon Kachaplayuk
Noppanon Kachaplayuk
Association football fullbacks
Noppanon Kachaplayuk
Noppanon Kachaplayuk
Noppanon Kachaplayuk
Noppanon Kachaplayuk